Neopestalotiopsis is a genus of plant pathogens in the family Sporocadaceae.

The genus was published by Maharachch., K.D. Hyde & Crous in Studies in Mycology vol.79 on page 135 in 2014.
The type species is Neopestalotiopsis protearum 

It was named after its morphological similarity to Pestalotiopsis.

Neopestalotiopsis is widespread, occurring as saprobes or pathogens on various host plants (Maharachchikumbura et al. 2014, Farr & Rossman 2019). The genus is distinct from Pestalotiopsis in having versicolourous median cells. The conidia is either composed of two upper median cells that are darker than the lowest median cell and they have indistinct conidiophores.

It was originally placed in family Pestalotiopsidaceae before that was absorbed into the family Sporocadaceae. Jaklitsch et al. (2016), synonymised Bartaliniaceae, Discosiaceae, Pestalotiopsidaceae and Robillardaceae, and then revived the older family name of Sporocadaceae to accommodate them (Crous et al. 2015). Pestalotiopsidaceae is still sometimes used.

Species within this group commonly occurs on plants as endophytes, pathogens or saprobes (Jeewon et al. 2004, Liu et al. 2010, Hyde et al. 2016, Reddy et al. 2016, Shetty et al. 2016, Ran et al. 2017, Bezerra et al. 2018, Freitas et al. 2019). Current research showed them as plant pathogens causing stem blight, flower blight, twig dieback and fruit rot (Akinsanmi et al. 2016,<ref name="Akinsanmi2016">{{cite journal |last1=Akinsanmi |first1=O.A. |last2=Nisa |first2=S. |last3=Jeffego |first3=O.S. |last4=Drenth |first4=A. |title=Multiple Pestalotiopsis and Neopestalotiopsis species cause flower blight of macadamia in Australia. |journal=Phytopathology |date=2016 |volume=106 |issue=12 |pages=122‑122}}</ref> Borrero et al. 2017, Mahapatra et al. 2018, Rodríguez-Gálvez et al. 2020). In the past few years, China and Thailand are places where most species of Neopestalotiopsis were found (Norphanphoun et al. 2019).
Pestalotiopsis-like fungi are widely distributed in many plants and include endophytes, pathogens and saprobes. Five strains of Neopestalotiopsis were isolated from diseased leaves of Rhapis excelsa (Principes, Palmae), Rhododendron simsii and Rhododendron championiae (Ericales, Ericaceae) and Erythropalum scandens, (Santalales, Olacaceae) in southern China.
Species Neopestalotiopsis clavispora has been found on the fallen leaves of Quercus rubra in Auburn, Alabamain USA, and on the dead leaves of species of Magnolia in Guangxi Province, China. It was found that Neopestalotiopsis clavispora causes leaf blight on strawberry (Fragaria × ananassa ). In 2021, Neopestalotiopsis spp. were found causing leaf spot and fruit rot on strawberry in Florida, USA. In China, Neopestalotiopsis brasiliensis and Neopestalotiopsis asiatica have been found on the diseased leaves of Castanea mollissima.

Distribution
It is has a widespread, cosmopolitan distribution, including Mexico, Peru, Alabama, USA, India, Sri Lanka, China, Thailand. New Zealand, and Australia.

Species
Up to 2022, 49 taxa of Neopestalotiopsis were known. But more have been added. Current species list as accepted by Species Fungorum;

Neopestalotiopsis acrostichi 
Neopestalotiopsis alpapicalis 
Neopestalotiopsis amomi 
Neopestalotiopsis aotearoa 
Neopestalotiopsis asiatica 
Neopestalotiopsis australis 
Neopestalotiopsis brachiata 
Neopestalotiopsis brasiliensis 
Neopestalotiopsis camelliae-oleiferae  
Neopestalotiopsis cavernicola 
Neopestalotiopsis chiangmaiensis 
Neopestalotiopsis chrysea 
Neopestalotiopsis clavispora 
Neopestalotiopsis cocoes 
Neopestalotiopsis cubana 
Neopestalotiopsis dendrobii 
Neopestalotiopsis drenthii 
Neopestalotiopsis egyptiaca 
Neopestalotiopsis elaeidis 
Neopestalotiopsis ellipsospora 
Neopestalotiopsis eucalypticola 
Neopestalotiopsis eucalyptorum 
Neopestalotiopsis foedans 
Neopestalotiopsis formicidarum 
Neopestalotiopsis fragariae 
Neopestalotiopsis guajavae 
Neopestalotiopsis guajavicola 
Neopestalotiopsis hadrolaeliae 
Neopestalotiopsis hispanica 
Neopestalotiopsis honoluluana 
Neopestalotiopsis hydeana 
Neopestalotiopsis hyperici 
Neopestalotiopsis iberica 
Neopestalotiopsis iranensis 
Neopestalotiopsis javaensis 
Neopestalotiopsis longiappendiculata 
Neopestalotiopsis lusitanica 
Neopestalotiopsis macadamiae 
Neopestalotiopsis maddoxii 
Neopestalotiopsis magna 
Neopestalotiopsis mesopotamica 
Neopestalotiopsis musae 
Neopestalotiopsis natalensis 
Neopestalotiopsis nebuloides 
Neopestalotiopsis olumideae 
Neopestalotiopsis pandanicola 
Neopestalotiopsis pernambucana 
Neopestalotiopsis perukae 
Neopestalotiopsis petila 
Neopestalotiopsis phangngaensis 
Neopestalotiopsis photiniae 
Neopestalotiopsis piceana 
Neopestalotiopsis protearum 
Neopestalotiopsis psidii 
Neopestalotiopsis rhapidis 
Neopestalotiopsis rhizophorae 
Neopestalotiopsis rhododendri 
Neopestalotiopsis rosae 
Neopestalotiopsis rosicola 
Neopestalotiopsis samarangensis 
Neopestalotiopsis saprophytica 
Neopestalotiopsis scalabiensis 
Neopestalotiopsis sichuanensis 
Neopestalotiopsis sonneratiae 
Neopestalotiopsis steyaertii 
Neopestalotiopsis suphanburiensis 
Neopestalotiopsis surinamensis 
Neopestalotiopsis thailandica 
Neopestalotiopsis umbrinospora 
Neopestalotiopsis vaccinii 
Neopestalotiopsis vacciniicola 
Neopestalotiopsis vheenae 
Neopestalotiopsis vitis 
Neopestalotiopsis zakeelii 
Neopestalotiopsis zimbabwana

References

Amphisphaeriales
Taxa described in 2018